Diodora fragilis is a species of sea snail, a marine gastropod mollusk in the family Fissurellidae, the keyhole limpets.

Description
The size of the shell reaches 20 mm.

Distribution
This species occurs in the Caribbean Sea off Cuba.

References

 Pérez Farfante, I. and D. L. Henríquez. 1946. Nueva especie de Diodora. Revista de la Sociedad Malacológica "Carlos de la Torre" 4: 54.

Fissurellidae
Gastropods described in 1947